The Great Siege of Malta (Maltese: L-Assedju l-Kbir) occurred in 1565 when the Ottoman Empire attempted to conquer the island of Malta, then held by the Knights Hospitaller. The siege lasted nearly four months, from 18 May to 12 September 1565.

The Knights Hospitaller had been headquartered in Malta since 1530, after being driven out of Rhodes, also by the Ottomans, in 1522, following the siege of Rhodes. The Ottomans first attempted to take Malta in 1551 but failed. In 1565, Suleiman the Magnificent, the Ottoman Sultan, made a second attempt to take Malta. The Knights, who numbered around 500 together with approximately 6,000 footsoldiers, withstood the siege and repelled the invaders. This victory became one of the most celebrated events of sixteenth-century Europe, to the point that Voltaire said: "Nothing is better known than the siege of Malta." It undoubtedly contributed to the eventual erosion of the European perception of Ottoman invincibility, although the Mediterranean continued to be contested between Christian coalitions and the Muslim Turks for many years.

The siege was the climax of an escalating contest between the Christian alliances and the Islamic Ottoman Empire for control of the Mediterranean, a contest that included the Turkish attack on Malta in 1551, the Ottoman destruction of an allied Christian fleet at the Battle of Djerba in 1560, and the decisive Ottoman defeat at the Battle of Lepanto in 1571.

The Knights of Malta

By the end of 1522, Suleiman the Magnificent, the Ottoman Sultan, had forcibly ejected the Knights from their base on Rhodes after the six-month siege of Rhodes.  From 1523 to 1530 the Order lacked a permanent home. They became known as the Knights of Malta when, on 26 October 1530, Philippe Villiers de L'Isle-Adam, Grand Master of the Knights, sailed into Malta's Grand Harbour with a number of his followers to lay claim to Malta and Gozo, which had been granted to them by Holy Roman Emperor Charles V in return for one falcon sent annually to the Viceroy of Sicily and a solemn Mass to be celebrated on All Saints Day.  Charles also required the Knights to garrison Tripoli on the North African coast, which was in territory that the Barbary corsairs, allies of the Ottomans, controlled. The Knights accepted the offer reluctantly. Malta was a small, desolate island, and for some time, many of the Knights clung to the dream of recapturing Rhodes.

Nevertheless, the Order soon turned Malta into a naval base. The island's position in the centre of the Mediterranean made it a strategically crucial gateway between East and West, especially as the Barbary corsairs increased their forays into the western Mediterranean throughout the 1540s and 1550s.

In particular, the corsair Dragut was proving to be a major threat to the Christian nations of the central Mediterranean. Dragut and the Knights were continually at loggerheads. In 1551, Dragut and the Ottoman admiral Sinan decided to take Malta and invaded the island with a force of about 10,000 men. After only a few days, however, Dragut broke off the siege and moved to the neighbouring island of Gozo, where he bombarded the Cittadella for several days. The Knights' governor on Gozo, Gelatian de Sessa, having decided that resistance was futile, threw open the doors to the Cittadella. The corsairs sacked the town and took virtually the entire population of Gozo (approximately 5,000 people) into captivity.  Dragut and Sinan then sailed south to Tripoli, where they soon seized the Knights' garrison there.  They initially installed a local leader, Aga Morat, as governor, but subsequently Dragut himself took control of the area.

Expecting another Ottoman invasion within a year, Grand Master of the Knights Juan de Homedes ordered the strengthening of Fort Saint Angelo at the tip of Birgu (now Vittoriosa), as well as the construction of two new forts, Fort Saint Michael on the Senglea promontory and Fort Saint Elmo at the seaward end of Mount Sciberras (now Valletta).  The two new forts were built in the remarkably short period of six months in 1552.  All three forts proved crucial during the Great Siege.

The next several years were relatively calm, although the guerre de course, or running battle, between Muslims and Christians continued unabated.  In 1557 the Knights elected Jean Parisot de Valette Grand Master of the Order. He continued his raids on non-Christian shipping, and his private vessels are known to have taken some 3,000 Muslim and Jewish slaves during his tenure as Grand Master.

By 1559 Dragut was causing the Christian powers such distress, even raiding the coasts of Spain, that Philip II organized the largest naval expedition in fifty years to evict the corsair from Tripoli.  The Knights joined the expedition, which consisted of about 54 galleys and 14,000 men. This ill-fated campaign climaxed in the Battle of Djerba in May 1560, when Ottoman admiral Piyale Pasha surprised the Christian fleet off the Tunisian island of Djerba, capturing or sinking about half the Christian ships.  The battle was a disaster for the Christians and it marked the high point of Ottoman domination of the Mediterranean.

Towards the siege

After Djerba there could be little doubt that the Turks would eventually attack Malta again. Malta was of immense strategic importance to the Ottoman long-term plan to conquer more of Europe, since Malta was a stepping stone to Sicily, and Sicily in turn could be a base for an invasion of the Kingdom of Naples. In August 1560, Jean de Valette sent a despatch to all the Order's priories ordering that their knights prepare to return to Malta as soon as a citazione (summons) was issued.  The Turks made a strategic error in not attacking at once, while the Spanish fleet lay in ruins, as the five-year delay allowed Spain to rebuild its forces.

Meanwhile, the Knights continued to prey on Turkish shipping. In mid-1564, Romegas, the Order's most notorious seafarer, captured several large merchantmen, including one that belonged to the Chief Eunuch of the seraglio, and took numerous high-ranking prisoners, including the governor of Cairo, the governor of Alexandria, and the former nurse of Sultan Suleiman's daughter.  Romegas' exploits gave the Turks a casus belli, and by the end of 1564, Suleiman had resolved to wipe the Knights of Malta off the face of the earth.

By early 1565, Grand Master de Valette's network of spies in Constantinople had informed him  that the invasion was imminent.  De Valette set about raising troops in Italy, laying in stores and finishing work on Fort Saint Angelo, Fort Saint Michael, and Fort Saint Elmo.

Tactics and weaponry

All known techniques of siege warfare were employed during the siege of Malta. Turkish forces had a huge siege tower with a drawbridge from which sharpshooters fired over the walls of Fort St. Angelo. The tower was constructed to be resistant to fire with leather sheets kept moist from water tanks contained inside the tower. Despite this, Maltese masons had hidden artillery within the walls, leaving the outer masonry in place to conceal it from view. Concealed from sight, the defenders were able to move the cannon into position, loaded with chain shot, without revealing its location to the Turks, who had already taken positions in the tower when it was destroyed.

The armies
The Turkish armada, which set sail from Istanbul on 22 March, was by all accounts one of the largest assembled since antiquity. According to one of the earliest and most complete histories of the siege, that of the Order's official historian Giacomo Bosio, the fleet consisted of 193 vessels, which included 131 galleys, seven galliots (small galleys), and four galleasses (large galleys), the remainder being transport vessels. Contemporary letters from Don Garcia, the Viceroy of Sicily, give similar numbers."

The Italian mercenary Francisco Balbi di Correggio (serving as an arquebusier in the Spanish corps), gave the forces as:

The Knight Hipolito Sans, in a lesser-known account, also lists about 48,000 invaders, although it is not clear how independent his work is from Balbi's.  Other contemporary authors give much lower figures.  In a letter written to Philip II only four days after the siege began, de Valette himself says that "the number of soldiers that will make land is between 15,000 and 16,000, including seven thousand arquebusiers or more, that is four thousand janissaries and three thousand sipahis." On the other hand, in a letter to the Prior of Germany a month after the siege, de Valette writes, "This fleet consisted of two hundred and fifty ships, triremes, biremes and other vessels; the nearest estimate we could make of the enemy's force was 40,000 fighting men."  That de Valette gives the enemy fleet as 250 vessels, a number much above any one else's, shows that the Grand Master himself was not above exaggeration.

Indeed, a letter written during the siege by the liaison with Sicily, Captain Vincenzo Anastagi, states the enemy force was only 22,000 and several other letters of the time give similar numbers.  However, Bosio arrives at a total of about 30,000, which is consistent with Balbi's "named troops." Richard Knolles' history gives essentially the same figure.

The siege

Arrival of the Ottomans
Before the Turks arrived, de Valette ordered the harvesting of all the crops, including unripened grain, to deprive the enemy of any local food supplies. Furthermore, the Knights poisoned all wells with bitter herbs and dead animals.

The Turkish armada arrived at dawn on Friday, 18 May, but did not at once make land. The first fighting broke out on 19 May. A day later, the Ottoman fleet sailed up the southern coast of the island, turned around and finally anchored at Marsaxlokk (Marsa Sirocco) Bay, nearly 10 kilometers (6.2 miles) from the Grand Harbour region. According to most accounts, in particular Balbi's, a dispute arose between the leader of the land forces, the 4th Vizier serdar Kızılahmedli Mustafa Pasha, and the supreme naval commander, Piyale Pasha, about where to anchor the fleet. Piyale wished to shelter it at Marsamxett Harbour, just north of the Grand Harbour, in order to avoid the sirocco and be nearer the action, but Mustafa disagreed, because to anchor the fleet there would require first reducing Fort St. Elmo, which guarded the entrance to the harbour.  Mustafa intended, according to these accounts, to attack the poorly defended former capital Mdina, which stood in the centre of the island, then attack Forts St. Angelo and Michael by land. If so, an attack on Fort St. Elmo would have been entirely unnecessary.  Nevertheless, Mustafa relented, apparently believing only a few days would be necessary to destroy St. Elmo.  After the Turks were able to emplace their guns, at the end of May they commenced a bombardment.

It certainly seems true that Suleiman had seriously blundered in splitting the command three ways. He not only split command between Piyale and Mustafa, but he ordered both of them to defer to Dragut when he arrived from Tripoli. Contemporary letters from spies in Constantinople, however, suggest that the plan had always been to take Fort St. Elmo first. In any case, for the Turks to concentrate their efforts on it proved a critical mistake.

While the Ottomans were landing, the knights and Maltese made some last-minute improvements to the defences of Birgu and Senglea. The Ottomans set up their main camp in Marsa, which was close to the Knights' fortifications. In the following days, the Ottomans set up camps and batteries on Santa Margherita Hill and the Sciberras Peninsula. The attacks on Birgu began on 21 May, while Senglea was first attacked a day later.

Capture of Fort St. Elmo

Having correctly calculated that the Turks would seek to secure a disembarkation point for their fleet and would thus begin the campaign by attempting to capture Fort St Elmo, de Valette sent reinforcements and concentrated half of his heavy artillery within the fort. His intent was for them to hold out for a relief promised by Don Garcia, Viceroy of Sicily. The unremitting bombardment of the fort from three dozen guns on the higher ground of Mt. Sciberras began on 27 May, and reduced the fort to rubble within a week, but de Valette evacuated the wounded nightly and resupplied the fort from across the harbour. After arriving in May, Dragut set up new batteries to imperil the ferry lifeline. On 3 June, a party of Janissaries managed to seize the fort's ravelin and ditch. Still, by 8 June, the Knights sent a message to the Grand Master that the Fort could no longer be held but were rebuffed with messages that St Elmo must hold until the reinforcements arrived.

The Turks attacked the damaged walls on June 10 and 15, and made an all out assault on June 16, during which even the slave and hired galley oarsmen housed in St Elmo, as well as the native Maltese soldiers, reportedly fought and died "almost as bravely as the Knights themselves." Two days later, Dragut was seen in a trench cannon emplacement arguing with the Turkish gunners about their level of fire.  At Dragut's insistence a cannon's aim was lowered, but the aim was too low, and when fired its ball detached part of the trench, which hit Dragut in the head, killing him, (although according to Bosio, it was a lucky shot from Fort St. Angelo that mortally wounded him).

Finally, on 23 June, the Turks seized what was left of Fort St. Elmo. They killed all the defenders, totaling over 1,500 men, but spared nine Knights whom the Corsairs had captured. A small number of Maltese managed to escape by swimming across the harbour.

Although the Turks did succeed in capturing St. Elmo, allowing Piyale to anchor his fleet in Marsamxett, the siege of Fort St. Elmo had cost the Turks at least 6,000 men, including half of their Janissaries.

Mustafa had the bodies of the knights decapitated and their bodies floated across the bay on mock crucifixes.  In response, de Valette beheaded all his Turkish prisoners, loaded their heads into his cannons, and fired them into the Turkish camp.

Panic
By this time, word of the siege was spreading. As soldiers and adventurers gathered in Sicily for Don Garcia's relief, panic spread as well. There can be little doubt that the stakes were high, perhaps higher than at any other time in the contest between the Ottoman Empire and Europe. Queen Elizabeth I of England wrote:

All contemporary sources indicate the Turks intended to proceed to the Tunisian fortress of La Goletta and wrest it from the Spaniards, and Suleiman had also spoken of invading Europe through Italy.

However, modern scholars tend to disagree with this interpretation of the siege's importance.  H.J.A. Sire, a historian who has written a history of the Order, is of the opinion that the siege represented an overextension of Ottoman forces, and argues that if the island had fallen, it would have quickly been retaken by a massive Spanish counterattack.

Although Don Garcia did not at once send the promised relief (troops were still being levied), he persuaded Philip II to allow him to release an advance force of some 600 men under the command of Don Melchior de Robles, a Spanish knight.  After several attempts, this piccolo soccorso managed to land on Malta in early July and sneak into Birgu, raising the spirits of the besieged garrison immensely. However this relief force was too small to make any significant impact. Don Garcia pleaded with Philip II to authorize a much larger relief force to be deployed but the Spanish king was indecisive and fearful of risking his newly assembled fleet.

The Senglea Peninsula

On 15 July, Mustafa ordered a double attack against the Senglea peninsula.  He had transported 100 small vessels across Mt. Sciberras to the Grand Harbour, thus avoiding the strong cannons of Fort St. Angelo, in order to launch a sea attack against the promontory using about 1,000 Janissaries, while the Corsairs attacked Fort St. Michael on the landward end.  Luckily for the Maltese, a defector warned de Valette about the impending strategy and the Grand Master had time to construct a palisade along the Senglea promontory, which successfully helped to deflect the attack.  Nevertheless, the assault probably would have succeeded had the Turkish boats not come into point-blank range (less than 200 yards) of a sea-level battery of five cannons that had been constructed by Commander Chevalier de Guiral at the base of Fort St. Angelo with the sole purpose of stopping such an amphibious attack.  Just two salvos sank all but one of the vessels, killing or drowning over 800 of the attackers. The land attack failed simultaneously when relief forces were able to cross to Ft. St. Michael across a floating bridge, with the result that Malta was saved for the day.

The Turks by now had ringed Birgu and Senglea with some 65 siege guns and subjected the town to what was probably the most sustained bombardment in history up to that time.  (Balbi claims that 130,000 cannonballs were fired during the course of the siege.)  Having largely destroyed one of the town's crucial bastions, Mustafa ordered another massive double assault on 7 August, this time against Fort St. Michael and Birgu itself.  On this occasion, the Turks breached the town walls and it seemed that the siege was over, but unexpectedly the invaders retreated. As it happened, the cavalry commander Captain Vincenzo Anastagi, on his daily sortie from Mdina, had attacked the unprotected Turkish field hospital, killing everyone and beheading more than sixty Turks. The Turks, thinking the Christian relief had arrived from Sicily, broke off their assault.

St. Michael and Birgu
After the attack of 7 August, the Turks resumed their bombardment of St. Michael and Birgu, mounting at least one other major assault against the town on 19–21 August. What actually happened during those days of intense fighting is not entirely clear.

Bradford's account of the climax of the siege has a mine exploding with a huge blast, breaching the town walls and causing stone and dust to fall into the ditch, with the Turks charging even as the debris was still falling. He also has the 70-year-old de Valette saving the day by leading towards the Turks some hundred troops that had been waiting in the Piazza of Birgu. Balbi, in his diary entry for 20 August, says only that de Valette was told the Turks were within the walls; the Grand Master ran to "the threatened post where his presence worked wonders.  Sword in hand, he remained at the most dangerous place until the Turks retired."  Bosio also has no mention of the successful detonation of a mine.  Rather, in his report a panic ensued when the townspeople spied the Turkish standards outside the walls. The Grand Master ran there, but found no Turks. In the meantime, a cannonade atop Ft. St. Angelo, stricken by the same panic, killed a number of townsfolk with friendly fire.

Fort St. Michael and Mdina
The situation was sufficiently dire that, at some point in August, the Council of Elders decided to abandon the town and retreat to Fort St. Angelo.  De Valette, however, vetoed this proposal.  If he guessed that the Turks were losing their will, he was correct.  Although the bombardment and minor assaults continued, the invaders were stricken by an increasing desperation.  Towards the end of August, the Turks attempted to take Fort St. Michael, first with the help of a manta (similar to a Testudo formation), a small siege engine covered with shields, then by use of a full-blown siege tower.  In both cases, Maltese engineers tunneled out through the rubble and destroyed the constructions with point-blank salvos of chain shot.

At the beginning of September, the weather was turning and Mustafa ordered a march on Mdina, intending to winter there.  However the attack failed to occur. The poorly-defended and supplied city deliberately started firing its cannon at the approaching Turks at pointlessly long range; this bluff scared them away by fooling the already demoralised Turks into thinking the city had ammunition to spare. By 8 September, the Turks had embarked their artillery and were preparing to leave the island, having lost perhaps a third of their men to fighting and disease.

Gran Soccorso
On 7 September, Don Garcia had, at last, landed about 8,000 men at St. Paul's Bay on the north end of the island. The so-called Grande Soccorso ("great relief") positioned themselves on the ridge of San Pawl tat-Tarġa on the 13th of September, waiting for the Ottoman assault. It is said that, when some hot-headed knights of the relief force saw the Ottoman retreat and the burning villages, in its wake, they charged without waiting for orders from Ascanio della Corgna. Della Corgna, seeing the troops in such spirits, had no choice but to order a general charge which resulted in the massacre of the retreating Ottoman force, who retreated from the islands on 13 September.

Malta had survived the Ottoman assault, and throughout Europe people celebrated what would turn out to be the last epic battle involving Crusader Knights.

The relief force consisted of mainly Spanish and Italian soldiers, sent by the Spanish Empire as well as the Duchy of Florence, the Republic of Genoa, the Papal States, and the Duchy of Savoy.

Aftermath

The number of casualties is in as much dispute as the number of invaders. Balbi gives 35,000 Turkish deaths, Bosio 30,000 casualties (including sailors). Several other sources give about 25,000. The knights lost a third of their number, and Malta lost a third of its inhabitants. Birgu and Senglea were essentially leveled. Still, 9,000 defenders had managed to withstand a siege of more than four months in the hot summer, despite enduring a bombardment of some 130,000 cannonballs.

Jean de Valette, Grand Master of the Knights of Malta, had a key influence in the victory against the Ottomans with his example and his ability to encourage and hold people together. This example had a major impact, bringing together the kings of Europe in an alliance against the previously seemingly invincible Ottomans; the result was the vast union of forces against the Ottomans at the Battle of Lepanto six years later. Such was the gratitude of Europe for the knights' heroic defence that money soon began pouring into the island, allowing de Valette to construct a fortified city, Valletta, on Mt. Sciberras. His intent was to deny the position to any future enemies. De Valette himself died in Buskett at a hunting accident next to the Verdala Palaces in 1568.

In literature and historical fiction

See also
 Algiers expedition (1541)
 Barbary corsairs
 Battle of Djerba
 Battle of Lepanto
 Battle of Preveza
 List of Ottoman sieges and landings
 List of sieges
 Siege of Rhodes (1480)
 Siege of Rhodes (1522)
 Toni Bajada
 Grand Harbour of Malta tornado

Notes

References
 Allen, Bruce Ware, The Great Siege of Malta: The Epic Battle between the Ottoman Empire and the Knights of St. John, Hanover N.H., ForeEdge 2017 . 
 
 Bradford, Ernle, The Sultan's Admiral: The Life of Barbarossa, London, 1968.
 
 
 Currey, E. Hamilton, Sea-Wolves of the Mediterranean, London, 1910
 Pickles, Tim. Malta 1565: Last Battle of the Crusades; Osprey Campaign Series #50, Osprey Publishing, 1998.
 Rothman, Tony, "The Great Siege of Malta", in History Today, January 2007.
 Spiteri, Stephen C.  The Great Siege: Knights vs. Turks, 1565.  Malta, The Author, 2005.
 Wolf, John B., The Barbary Coast: Algeria under the Turks. New York, 1979;

External links

 Army and the Military Ranks at TheOttomans.org
 In Our Time podcast episode, hosted by Melvyn Bragg, with guests Helen Nicholson, Diarmaid MacCulloch, and Kate Fleet.

Malta 1565
Malta 1565
Conflicts in 1565
History of Malta
Islam in Malta
Sieges involving Malta
Malta 1565
Siege of Malta
Ottoman–Spanish conflicts
1565 in Malta
Amphibious operations
Invasions of Malta
History of the Sovereign Military Order of Malta